GYAN, Gyān, Gyaan or Gyan may refer to:

People 
 Asamoah Gyan (born 1985), Ghanaian footballer
 Baffour Gyan (born 1980), Ghanaian footballer
 Christian Gyan (1978-2021), Ghanaian footballer
 Gyan Evans (born 1960), Australian musician
 Gyan Prakash Pilania (born 1932), Indian social reformer
 Gyan Prakash (born 1952), historian of modern India
 Gyan Singh (Fijian politician)
 Gyan Singh (Indian politician)
 Kiki Gyan (1957-2004), Ghanaian musician

Other uses
 Gyan (Sanskrit), a Sanskrit word that roughly translates to 'knowledge' in English
 Global Youth Action Network, a youth empowerment organization
 Gyan (album), the debut album by Gyan Evans

See also
 Gian, a given name